Orontobia murzini is a moth of the family Erebidae. It was described by Vladimir Viktorovitch Dubatolov in 2005. It is found in Sichuan, China.

References

Arctiina
Moths described in 2005